Vicenç Sasot Fraucà (21 January 1918 – 12 April 1985) was a Spanish football player and manager.

Career
Born in Peñalba, Sasot played as a defender for Sabadell. He also managed Barcelona, Condal, Mallorca and Calvo Sotelo.

References

1918 births
1985 deaths
Spanish footballers
CE Sabadell FC footballers
La Liga players
Association football defenders
Spanish football managers
UE Lleida managers
FC Barcelona managers
RCD Mallorca managers
CD Puertollano managers
CD Condal managers
Girona FC managers
CD Atlético Baleares managers